Neora Naddi Railway Station  is the railway station that serves tea gardens and nearby areas of Neora Naddi, Kumali, Neora, Kumarpara, Rajadanga etc in  Jalpaiguri district in the Indian state of West Bengal. The station lies on New Mal–Changrabandha–New Cooch Behar line of Northeast Frontier Railway, Alipurduar railway division. Some local trains like Siliguri Bamanhat DEMU, Siliguri New Bongaigaon DEMU, Siliguri Dhubri DEMU etc are available from this station daily.

References

Railway stations in Jalpaiguri district
Alipurduar railway division
Railway stations in West Bengal